Hilmir Snær Guðnason (born 24 January 1969, in Reykjavík) is an Icelandic actor and voice actor. He is famous in his native country and has appeared in both film and on stage. In 2000 he was named as one of European films 'Shooting Stars' by European Film Promotion. He is best known for his roles in the films 101 Reykjavík, Hafið (The Sea in English), Blueprint and Guy X.

Life and career 
Hilmir graduated from the Iceland Academy of the Arts in 1994. He has played in a number of plays and musicals. Notably Hair and Rocky Horror Picture Show. His work with the National Theatre of Iceland are, to name a few: Midsummer Night's Dream, Macbeth, West Side Story, Hamlet, Who's Afraid of Virginia Woolf and Ivanov.

He is married to Bryndís Jónsdóttir and has two daughters born in 1995 and 2009.

Filmography

Film

Television

Awards and honors

External links

References

1969 births
Living people
Hilmir Snaer Gudnason
People with epilepsy
Hilmir Snaer Gudnason
Hilmir Snaer Gudnason
Hilmir Snaer Gudnason
Hilmir Snaer Gudnason
Hilmir Snaer Gudnason
Hilmir Snaer Gudnason